Love Outside Andromeda is the debut, self-titled album by Australian indie rock band, Love Outside Andromeda. It was released in September 2004, which peaked at No. 77 on the ARIA Albums Chart. The album consists of twelve tracks and includes experiments with a wide variety of time signatures. The track, "Boxcutter, Baby", was written about the Sasebo slashing.

Reception 

National youth radio station, Triple J, declared Love Outside Andromeda to be their Album of the Week upon its release.

Track listing

All tracks are written by Sianna Lee.

 "Tongue Like a Tether"  – 3:28
 "Made of Broken Glass"  – 3:55
 "Gonna Try to Be a Girl"  – 2:26
 "Boxcutter, Baby" – 4:54
 "Something White and Sigmund"  – 3:55
 "Your Baby, My Blood"  – 3:34
 "Hecate Pose"  – 3:50
 "Chameleon"  – 4:15
 "Improper Methods"  – 4:11
 "Juno"  – 3:35
 "If You Really Want So Little from Me"  – 2:07
 "Achilles (All 3)"  – 3:50

Personnel 
 Sianna Lee – vocals and guitar
 Jamie Slocombe – guitar and vocals
 Jesse Lee – bass
 Joe Hammond – drums and gong
 Alastair Watts – cello on tracks 4, 7, 8, 11

Charts

References

External links 

Love Outside Andromeda | Releases

2004 debut albums
Love Outside Andromeda albums
Shock Records albums